Events from the year 1820 in China.

Incumbents
 Jiaqing Emperor (25th year)

Events 
 April 1 — Benjamin Chew Wilcocks becomes Consul of the United States at the Port of Canton
 September  — Jiaqing Emperor died suddenly of unknown causes. Mianning inherited the throne at the age of 38, becoming the Daoguang Emperor. He became the first Qing emperor who was the eldest legitimate son of his father

References 

 
China